Anthony Rosen (19 December 1930 – 22 March 2007) was a farmer who bucked the trend towards smaller scale organic farming. An entrepreneurial agriculturalist, he became an energetic advocate of large-scale farming.

Biography
After attending Framlingham College, Suffolk, and subsequently National Service, where he reached the rank of captain, he attended the East Sussex School of Agriculture.

In 1956 he managed to secure a position as manager of a heavy land farm in Sussex. He began to formulate views on farming practice and founded the Farm Management Association and chaired the Farm Buildings Association.

He had to pull out of this business when he ran out of investment partners and concentrated over the next few years in foreign enterprises where he held many senior posts in a variety of countries including Zimbabwe, Australia and New Zealand.

Alongside his farming activities he was a journalist with a column in Farming News and also wrote the occasional obituary in The Times.

In 1978 he became chairman of the Farmers' Club, and also served on the BBC’s Farm Advisory Committee.

Rosen was survived by his wife, Hilary, two sons and a daughter.

Notes

External links
Visit to Highgrove House

20th-century British farmers
1930 births
2007 deaths
21st-century British farmers